Katherine Elizabeth Upton (born June 10, 1992) is an American model. She first appeared in the Sports Illustrated Swimsuit Issue in 2011, and was the cover model for the 2012, 2013 and 2017 issues. In addition, she was the subject of the 100th-anniversary Vanity Fair cover.

Upton has also appeared in the films Tower Heist (2011), The Other Woman (2014) and The Layover (2017).

Early life
Upton was born in St. Joseph, Michigan. She is the daughter of Shelley (née Davis), a former Texas state tennis champion, and Jeff Upton, a high school athletics director. Her uncle is former U.S. Representative Fred Upton. Upton's great-grandfather, Frederick Upton, was co-founder of appliance manufacturer and marketer Whirlpool Corporation.

In 1999, Upton moved with her family to Melbourne, Florida, where she was a student at Holy Trinity Episcopal Academy. As a young equestrian, she showed at the American Paint Horse Association (APHA) and competed at a national level. With her horse Roanie, she won three APHA Reserve World Championships – 13 and Under Western Riding, 13 and Under Horsemanship, and 14–18 Western Riding. She was named the 13 and Under Reserve All-Around Champion, giving her a total of four reserve championships (2nd place). In addition, Upton ended up third overall on the APHA youth Top Twenty. With a second horse, Colby, she won 14–18 Western Riding and was included in the top 5 in 14–18 Horsemanship and 14–18 Western Pleasure in 2009.

Career

Upton attended a casting call in Miami for Elite Model Management in 2008 and was signed the same day. She eventually moved to New York City, where she then signed with IMG Models.

Upton first modeled clothing for Garage and Dooney & Bourke. She was the 2010–11 face of Guess. In 2011, Upton appeared in the Sports Illustrated Swimsuit Issue.  She was featured in the body paint section and named Rookie of the Year for the issue. She has since modeled for Beach Bunny Swimwear, and has appeared in Complex and Esquire as "The Woman of the Summer". Upton wore one of the Beach Bunny suits in the 2014 Sports Illustrated Swimsuit Issue.

In April 2011, an Internet video of her doing the dougie hip-hop dance at a Los Angeles Clippers game went viral and served to increase her popularity. Guy Trebay of The New York Times observed that this served to illustrate the power of social media to bestow stardom upon a model, which had previously been the domain of top designer runway shows. In April 2012, Upton appeared in a video of herself performing the Cat Daddy dance to the song of the same name by The Rej3ctz, which also went viral.

Upton made an appearance in a June 2011 episode of Tosh.0 and participated in the 2011 Taco Bell All-Star Legends & Celebrity Softball Game at Chase Field in Phoenix, Arizona, in July 2011.

Upton's acting debut was in the film, Tower Heist, as Mr. Hightower's mistress. It was released in November 2011. She also appeared in The Three Stooges as Sister Bernice.

Upton appeared on the cover of the 2012 Sports Illustrated Swimsuit Issue, released in February 2012. Upton has also recounted the negative aftereffects of the 2012 Sports Illustrated cover, as she was subjected to criticism and felt she had been objectified.

Upton has appeared in editorials for American, Italian, British, Spanish, German, and Brazilian Vogue, Harper's Bazaar, V, Mademoiselle, LOVE, Italian, German, and American GQ, Cosmopolitan, Glamour, and Esquire.
She has appeared on the covers of Italian, American, and British Vogue, French and American Elle, American, Italian, and German GQ, Esquire, and Vanity Fair.

She has appeared in advertising campaigns for David Yurman, Sam Edelman, Betsey Johnson, Guess?, Victoria's Secret, Express, and Bare Necessities. She was named the "new face" of Bobbi Brown cosmetics in 2014.

In 2012, she was ranked the fifth-sexiest model by Models.com She ranked #3 on the American publication of AskMen's Top 99 Women for 2013. In 2012, she was listed on Maxims Hot 100 list, citing her photo shoots with Sports Illustrated.

Upton was the cover model for the 2013 Sports Illustrated Swimsuit Issue for the second consecutive year. Parts of her 2013 Sports Illustrated pictorial were filmed in Antarctica and Upton suffered from failing hearing and eyesight due to the extreme cold.

After getting the November 2012 Vogue Italia cover photographed by Steven Meisel and the January 2013 Vogue UK cover, Upton landed the June 2013 Vogue cover by Mario Testino. She was then photographed by Annie Leibovitz for the October 2013 100th anniversary cover of Vanity Fair.

In September 2013, Upton was named Model of the Year at the 10th annual Style Awards at the Mercedes-Benz Fashion Week in New York.

Upton appeared on the flip-side cover of the 2014 50th-anniversary Sports Illustrated Swimsuit Issue, the first time that type of cover was used by that magazine. Part of her shoot took place at Cape Canaveral, capturing her in zero gravity.

In April 2014, she appeared with Cameron Diaz, Leslie Mann, and Nikolaj Coster-Waldau in the comedy The Other Woman as Amber, one of Coster-Waldau's character's mistresses.

In 2014, Upton starred with Tony Hale in Lady Antebellum's music video "Bartender".  People named Upton its "Sexiest Woman" for 2014, the first time the title has been awarded.  Also in 2014, Upton was the centerpiece of a $40 million advertising campaign for Machine Zone's mobile app Game of War: Fire Age.

In 2017, Upton starred with Alexandra Daddario in The Layover, a road trip sex comedy directed by William H. Macy. The film follows two best friends (Daddario and Upton) on vacation as they fight over the same man during a layover in St. Louis. Also that year, Upton appeared in James Franco's film adaptation The Disaster Artist, about the production of the film The Room.

Personal life

Upton is Christian, and has said that her belief in God is important to her. During a photo shoot, someone joked about a cross necklace she wore, saying, "Why are you wearing a cross? Like you would be religious", then took the necklace from her to do the shoot. Upton stated about the incident: "I was really affected by that. The whole thing made me realize that I do want a cross with me, at all times." As a result, Upton had a cross tattooed on the inside of her finger.

In 2014, nude photographs of Upton and several other female celebrities were illegally leaked to the Internet.

Upton started dating then Detroit Tigers (and now New York Mets) baseball pitcher Justin Verlander in early 2014, and they were engaged in 2016. On November 4, 2017 the couple married in Tuscany, Italy. They have a daughter who was born in November 2018.

For several years, Upton owned a boxer dog named Harley. He died in September 2021.

Filmography

Film

Television

Music videos

Awards and nominations

References

External links

 
 

1992 births
21st-century American actresses
Actresses from Florida
Actresses from Michigan
American Christians
American female equestrians
American film actresses
American people of Dutch descent
American people of English descent
American people of German descent
American people of Scottish descent
Female models from Florida
Female models from Michigan
Holy Trinity Episcopal Academy alumni
Living people
Kate
People from Melbourne, Florida
People from St. Joseph, Michigan
The Lions (agency) models